Peter Sejna (born 5 October 1979) is a Slovak former professional ice hockey center.

Biography
Sejna was born in Liptovský Mikuláš, Czechoslovakia. As a youth, he played in the 1993 Quebec International Pee-Wee Hockey Tournament with a team from Poprad. Sejna attended Colorado College, and in 2003 won the coveted Hobey Baker Award, given annually to the most outstanding collegiate hockey player. Sejna also won the bronze medal with the Slovak national ice hockey team in the 2003 Ice Hockey World Championship.

Career statistics

Regular season and playoffs

International

Awards and honors

References

External links

1979 births
Living people
Colorado College Tigers men's ice hockey players
Hobey Baker Award winners
Sportspeople from Liptovský Mikuláš
Peoria Rivermen (AHL) players
St. Louis Blues players
Slovak ice hockey left wingers
Undrafted National Hockey League players
Worcester IceCats players
ZSC Lions players
AHCA Division I men's ice hockey All-Americans
Slovak expatriate ice hockey players in the United States
Slovak expatriate ice hockey players in Switzerland